Four steamships have borne the name Dronning Maud, after the Norwegian Queen Maud:

  was a 1,761-ton Danish passenger/cargo ship launched on 10 August 1906, by Burmeister & Wain, Copenhagen, Denmark. Renamed several times before being scrapped in Helsinki, Finland in 1967.
  was a 1,102-ton Norwegian cargo ship completed in June 1907, by Laxevaag Maskin- og Jernskipsbyggeri, Bergen, Norway.
  was a 2,663-ton Norwegian cargo ship launched on 5 May 1917, by Fredrikstad Mekaniske Verksted in Fredrikstad, Norway.
  was a 1,489-ton Norwegian passenger/cargo ship launched on 8 May 1925, by Fredrikstad Mekaniske Verksted in Fredrikstad, Norway. Bombed and sunk by German aircraft off Gratangen on 1 May 1940.

References

Ship names